J P Nagara, officially Jayaprakash Narayan Nagara, is an established posh upmarket residential area located in the south of the Bangalore conurbation, India named after prominent Indian leader Jayaprakash Narayan. It is located in proximity to Jayanagar, and other areas Banashankari, Bannerghatta Road and BTM Layout.

References

 Neighbourhoods in Bangalore
 Memorials to Jayaprakash Narayan